The following squads were selected for the 2018 ICC Women's World Twenty20 tournament. On 10 October 2018 the International Cricket Council (ICC) confirmed all the squads for the tournament.

Australia
On 9 October 2018, Cricket Australia announced its squad:

 Meg Lanning (c)
 Nicole Bolton
 Nicola Carey
 Ashleigh Gardner
 Rachael Haynes
 Alyssa Healy
 Jess Jonassen
 Delissa Kimmince
 Sophie Molineux
 Beth Mooney
 Ellyse Perry
 Megan Schutt
 Elyse Villani
 Tayla Vlaeminck
 Georgia Wareham

Bangladesh
On 9 October 2018, the Bangladesh Cricket Board announced its squad:

 Salma Khatun (c)
 Rumana Ahmed
 Sharmin Akhter
 Nahida Akter
 Jahanara Alam
 Panna Ghosh
 Fargana Haque
 Sanjida Islam
 Fahima Khatun
 Khadija Tul Kubra
 Lata Mondol
 Ritu Moni
 Ayesha Rahman
 Nigar Sultana
 Shamima Sultana

England
On 4 October 2018, the England and Wales Cricket Board (ECB) announced its squad: Ahead of the tournament, Katherine Brunt was ruled out due to a back injury and was replaced by Fran Wilson.

 Heather Knight (c)
 Tammy Beaumont
 Katherine Brunt
 Sophia Dunkley
 Sophie Ecclestone
 Natasha Farrant
 Kirstie Gordon
 Jenny Gunn
 Danielle Hazell
 Amy Jones (wk)
 Nat Sciver
 Linsey Smith
 Anya Shrubsole
 Fran Wilson
 Lauren Winfield
 Danni Wyatt

India 
On 28 September 2018, the Board of Control for Cricket in India (BCCI) announced its squad: During the tournament, Pooja Vastrakar was injured and replaced by Devika Vaidya.

 Harmanpreet Kaur (c)
 Smriti Mandhana (vc)
 Taniya Bhatia (wk)
 Ekta Bisht
 Dayalan Hemalatha
 Mansi Joshi
 Veda Krishnamurthy
 Anuja Patil
 Mithali Raj
 Arundhati Reddy
 Jemimah Rodrigues
 Deepti Sharma
 Devika Vaidya
 Pooja Vastrakar
 Poonam Yadav
 Radha Yadav

Ireland
On 3 October 2018, Cricket Ireland announced its squad:

 Laura Delany (c)
 Kim Garth
 Cecelia Joyce
 Isobel Joyce
 Shauna Kavanagh
 Amy Kenealy
 Gaby Lewis
 Lara Maritz
 Ciara Metcalfe
 Lucy O'Reilly
 Celeste Raack
 Eimear Richardson
 Clare Shillington
 Rebecca Stokell
 Mary Waldron

New Zealand
On 18 September 2018, New Zealand Cricket announced its squad:

 Amy Satterthwaite (c)
 Suzie Bates
 Bernadine Bezuidenhout
 Sophie Devine
 Kate Ebrahim
 Maddy Green
 Holly Huddleston
 Hayley Jensen
 Leigh Kasperek
 Amelia Kerr
 Katey Martin
 Anna Peterson
 Hannah Rowe
 Lea Tahuhu
 Jess Watkin

Pakistan
On 10 October 2018, the ICC confirmed Pakistan's squad: No captain was initially named, as their regular captain, Bismah Maroof, was recovering from surgery. Later the same month, Javeria Khan was named as the captain of the squad. Bismah Maroof returned to the squad, replacing Sidra Ameen.

 Javeria Khan (c)
 Muneeba Ali
 Sidra Ameen
 Anam Amin
 Aiman Anwer
 Diana Baig
 Nida Dar
 Nahida Khan
 Bismah Maroof
 Sana Mir
 Sidra Nawaz
 Natalia Pervaiz
 Aliya Riaz
 Nashra Sandhu
 Omaima Sohail
 Ayesha Zafar

South Africa
On 9 October 2018, Cricket South Africa announced its squad:

 Dane van Niekerk (c)
 Trisha Chetty
 Moseline Daniels
 Yolani Fourie
 Shabnim Ismail
 Marizanne Kapp
 Masabata Klaas
 Lizelle Lee
 Suné Luus
 Zintle Mali
 Raisibe Ntozakhe
 Mignon du Preez
 Robyn Searle
 Tumi Sekhukhune
 Saarah Smith
 Chloe Tryon
 Faye Tunnicliffe
 Laura Wolvaardt

On the same day that Cricket South Africa named their squad for the tournament, the International Cricket Council (ICC) deemed the bowling action of Raisibe Ntozakhe to be illegal. Therefore, she was immediately suspended from bowling in international matches. Ntozakhe was replaced by Yolani Fourie, while Saarah Smith suffered an injury before the tournament and was replaced by Moseline Daniels. After the start of the tournament, Trisha Chetty was ruled out of South Africa's squad due to an injury and was replaced by Faye Tunnicliffe.

Sri Lanka
On 19 October 2018, Sri Lanka Cricket confirmed its squad:

 Chamari Athapaththu (c)
 Kavisha Dilhari
 Ama Kanchana
 Eshani Kaushalya
 Sugandika Kumari
 Dilani Manodara
 Yashoda Mendis
 Hasini Perera
 Udeshika Prabodhani
 Inoshi Priyadharshani
 Oshadi Ranasinghe
 Nilakshi de Silva
 Shashikala Siriwardene
 Rebeca Vandort
 Sripali Weerakkody

West Indies
On 10 October 2018, Cricket West Indies announced its squad: Before the start of the tournament, Hayley Matthews was appointed as the vice-captain of the team. Qiana Joseph replaced Sheneta Grimmond, who was injured.

 Stafanie Taylor (c)
 Hayley Matthews (vc)
 Merissa Aguilleira
 Shemaine Campbelle
 Shamilia Connell
 Britney Cooper
 Deandra Dottin
 Afy Fletcher
 Sheneta Grimmond
 Chinelle Henry
 Qiana Joseph
 Kycia Knight
 Natasha McLean
 Anisa Mohammed
 Chedean Nation
 Shakera Selman

References

ICC Women's World Twenty20 squads
2018 ICC Women's World Twenty20